Mönchengladbach is a city in North Rhine-Westphalia, Germany. It is located west of the Rhine, halfway between Düsseldorf and the Dutch border.

Geography

Municipal subdivisions

Since 2009, the territory of Mönchengladbach has comprised four (previously ten) boroughs which are subdivided into 44 districts.

The boroughs and their associated districts

 Nord: Am Wasserturm, Dahl, Eicken, Gladbach, Hardt-Mitte, Hardter Wald, Ohler, Venn, Waldhausen, Westend, Windberg
 Ost: Bettrath‑Hoven, Bungt, Flughafen, Giesenkirchen‑Mitte, Giesenkirchen‑Nord, Hardterbroich‑Pesch, Lürrip, Neuwerk‑Mitte, Schelsen, Uedding
 Süd: Bonnenbroich‑Geneicken, Geistenbeck, Grenzland‑Stadion, Heyden, Hockstein, Mülfort, Odenkirchen‑Mitte, Odenkirchen‑West, Pongs, Rheydt, Sasserath, Schloss Rheydt, Schmölderpark, Schrievers
 West: Hauptquartier, Hehn, Holt, Rheindahlen‑Land, Rheindahlen‑Mitte, Wanlo, Wickrath-Mitte, Wickrath‑West, Wickrathberg

History

Name and origins
The original name of the city was Gladbach, by which it is still often known today. To distinguish it from another town of the same name (the present Bergisch Gladbach), it took the name München-Gladbach in 1888. Between 1933 and 1950, it was written München Gladbach (short: M. Gladbach), without a hyphen. This spelling was seen as potentially misleading, as it could imply that Gladbach was a borough of Munich (München in German), so consequently the name was changed to Mönchen-Gladbach in 1950 (and subsequently Mönchengladbach in 1960) to avoid confusion.

The town was founded around Gladbach Abbey in 974. It was named after the Gladbach, a narrow brook which mostly runs underground today. The abbey and adjoining villages became a town in the 14th century. The town of Rheydt is located nearby and is incorporated into Mönchengladbach today.

Early history
The first settlements in the area of Mönchengladbach are approximately 300,000–400,000 years old and show remains of Homo erectus and Neanderthal. There are numerous cairns from the Neolithic and Bronze Ages.

The history of Mönchengladbach began with the construction of the Gladbach Minster and the founding of an abbey in the year 974 by Gero, Archbishop of Cologne, and his companion, the monk Sandrad of Trier.

To improve the settlement, the monks created a market north of the church in the 12th century. Craftsmen settled near the market. Gladbach received its town charter in 1364–1366. The "town" erected a town wall made of stone, which had to be maintained by the citizens. Remains of the wall can be found at the Geroweiher, as can remains of the "Thick Tower", an old fortified tower at the Waldhausener hill. Until the end of the 18th century, the city belonged to the department of Grevenbroich within the duchy of Jülich.

On 4 October 1794, the armed forces of the French revolution marched into the town, one day before the fortress Jülich had been handed over. When the Holy Roman Emperor Francis II ceded the left bank of the river Rhine to France with the Treaty of Lunéville in 1801, Gladbach fell under French laws suppressing religion. This was the end for the abbey, and the monastery was closed. On 31 October 1802, the last 31 monks left the monastery. The contents of the tremendous abbey library, well known outside Germany, were scattered or destroyed.

From 1798 until 1814, the Mairie Gladbach was part of Canton Odenkirchen, of the Arrondissement Krefeld, of the Roer Département.

Recent history
In 1815, Gladbach became part of the Kingdom of Prussia and seat of the Landkreis Gladbach, which was dissolved in 1929. In 1815 Gladbach became seat of the Bürgermeisterei (Office of mayor), which was split in 1859 into two parts: the City of Gladbach and Office of Mayor Obergeburth. The latter was renamed to München-Gladbach-Land in 1907.

From 1933 through 1975, the neighborhood of Rheydt was an independent city; the split from München-Gladbach was arranged by Joseph Goebbels, who was born locally. After reuniting with Mönchengladbach, the central station (Rheydt Hauptbahnhof) kept its original name, making Mönchengladbach the only city in Germany to have two rail stations each called Hauptbahnhof.

In response to the 10 May 1940 German invasion of Belgium, Mönchengladbach was bombed by RAF Bomber Command on the evening of 11 May. The bomber crews were attempting to interdict German troop movements on roads, intersections and rail lines in the area, especially the city's railyards. About half of the approximately 36 twin-engine Royal Air Force (RAF) bombers reportedly hit their targets, and three were shot down. Four people were killed on the ground, including a British woman living in Germany.

Eventually, the Prussian Rhine Province was dissolved after World War II, and the city became part of the new state of North Rhine-Westphalia which was formed in 1946.

Economy

Mönchengladbach's industrial ascent was mainly influenced by the development of the textile industry from the mid-19th to the mid-20th century. In addition, a textile-oriented machine industry also developed.

After the Second World War, a major structural change began, reducing the importance of the textile industry and attracting new economic sectors. At present, only 7 percent of employees work in the once dominant textile and clothing industry (for example: Van Laack and gardeur).

As part of the successful diversification of the business location, local government and representatives founded the Mönchengladbach Business Development Corporation (WFMG) in 1997. WFMG and the University of Applied Sciences Niederrhein have developed a five-pillar model for the future orientation of the business location. Thereafter textile and fashion, mechanical engineering and electrical engineering, logistics, the creative industry and the health sector are the leading sectors for the economic future of the city of Mönchengladbach. As part of an active cluster policy, the WFMG has partly initiated its own networks for these industries.

The most important employer in Mönchengladbach is the Santander Consumer Bank, which has its headquarters at Aachener Straße in Mönchengladbach's city center.

The economic structure includes: tool and spinning machines (Dörries Scharmann, Monforts, Trützschler, Schlafhorst), automatic conveyor systems, signal and system technology (Scheidt & Bachmann), transformers (SMS Meer), cables (Nexans Germany formerly Kabelwerk Rheydt), printed matter and foodstuffs.

Chocolatier Heinemann is known beyond the city limits for his cakes, pralines and baked goods, which he offers in cafés on site as well as in Düsseldorf and Munich. Furthermore, beer breweries are represented in Mönchengladbach. The Oettinger brewery produces at the site of the former Hannen brewery. The Hensen brewery has been producing a lower Rhine-type Altbier since 2015 at the former spring of the river Gladbach in the Waldhausen district.

Especially in the 1970s and 1980s nightlife was attractive to young party people from Düsseldorf. In the meantime, tourism in particular is playing a certain role. Mönchengladbach has about 40 hotels (for example: Hotel Burgund) and inns as well as a youth hostel in the district Hardter Wald. In total there are about 2000 beds. The number of overnight stays is over 200,000 annually.

Mönchengladbach Airport is dominated by general aviation. There are currently no scheduled services to and from Mönchengladbach. Additionally, there are few business-charter passenger flights. In June 2015 Hugo Junkers Hangar was opened as an aviation and event facility. Airplane enthusiasts can book sightseeing flights with Junkers Ju 52 from the 1940s. The next major international airport Düsseldorf Airport is only 20 kilometres (12 mi) away to the east.

Politics

Mayor
The current Mayor of Mönchengladbach is Felix Heinrichs of the Social Democratic Party (SPD) since 2020. The most recent mayoral election was held on 13 September 2020, with a runoff held on 27 September, and the results were as follows:

! rowspan=2 colspan=2| Candidate
! rowspan=2| Party
! colspan=2| First round
! colspan=2| Second round
|-
! Votes
! %
! Votes
! %
|-
| bgcolor=| 
| align=left| Felix Heinrichs
| align=left| Social Democratic Party
| 32,808
| 37.5
| 50,421
| 74.2
|-
| bgcolor=| 
| align=left| Frank Boss
| align=left| Christian Democratic Union
| 25,929
| 29.6
| 17,513
| 25.8
|-
| bgcolor=| 
| align=left| Boris Wolkowski
| align=left| Alliance 90/The Greens
| 15,304
| 17.5
|-
| bgcolor=| 
| align=left| Corina Bülow
| align=left| Alternative for Germany
| 4,706
| 5.4
|-
| bgcolor=| 
| align=left| Stefan Dahlmanns
| align=left| Free Democratic Party
| 3,149
| 3.6
|-
| bgcolor=| 
| align=left| Sebastian Merkens
| align=left| The Left
| 3,010
| 3.4
|-
| bgcolor=| 
| align=left| Chana Clarissa Lischewski
| align=left| Die PARTEI
| 1,914
| 2.2
|-
| bgcolor=| 
| align=left| Franz Josef Schiller
| align=left| Ecological Democratic Party
| 540
| 0.6
|-
| bgcolor=| 
| align=left| Sandra van den Broek
| align=left| National Democratic Party
| 186
| 0.2
|-
! colspan=3| Valid votes
! 87,546
! 97.3
! 67,934
! 99.3
|-
! colspan=3| Invalid votes
! 2,473
! 2.7
! 496
! 0.7
|-
! colspan=3| Total
! 90,019
! 100.0
! 68,430
! 100.0
|-
! colspan=3| Electorate/voter turnout
! 207,117
! 43.5
! 207,018
! 33.1
|-
| colspan=7| Source: State Returning Officer
|}

City council

The Mönchengladbach city council governs the city alongside the Mayor. The most recent city council election was held on 13 September 2020, and the results were as follows:

! colspan=2| Party
! Votes
! %
! +/-
! Seats
! +/-
|-
| bgcolor=| 
| align=left| Christian Democratic Union (CDU)
| 30,198
| 34.0
|  7.5
| 26
|  3
|-
| bgcolor=| 
| align=left| Social Democratic Party (SPD)
| 22,365
| 25.2
|  4.3
| 20
| ±0
|-
| bgcolor=| 
| align=left| Alliance 90/The Greens (Grüne)
| 18,879
| 21.2
|  10.6
| 16
|  9
|-
| bgcolor=| 
| align=left| Alternative for Germany (AfD)
| 5,282
| 5.9
|  4.5
| 5
|  4
|-
| bgcolor=| 
| align=left| Free Democratic Party (FDP)
| 4,911
| 5.5
|  1.0
| 4
|  1
|-
| bgcolor=| 
| align=left| The Left (Die Linke)
| 3,605
| 4.1
|  0.4
| 3
| ±0
|-
| bgcolor=| 
| align=left| Die PARTEI (PARTEI)
| 2,419
| 2.7
|  1.5
| 2
|  1
|-
| colspan=7 bgcolor=lightgrey| 
|-
| bgcolor=| 
| align=left| Ecological Democratic Party (ÖDP)
| 507
| 0.6
| New
| 0
| New
|-
| 
| align=left| Alliance for Innovation and Justice (BIG)
| 439
| 0.5
| New
| 0
| New
|-
| bgcolor=| 
| align=left| National Democratic Party (NPD)
| 229
| 0.3
|  0.6
| 0
|  1
|-
| bgcolor=| 
| align=left| Independents
| 30
| 0.0
| –
| 0
| –
|-
! colspan=2| Valid votes
! 88,864
! 98.7
! 
! 
! 
|-
! colspan=2| Invalid votes
! 1,160
! 1.3
! 
! 
! 
|-
! colspan=2| Total
! 90,024
! 100.0
! 
! 76
!  8
|-
! colspan=2| Electorate/voter turnout
! 207,117
! 43.5
!  0.8
! 
! 
|-
| colspan=7| Source: State Returning Officer
|}

Points of interest

 Municipal Abteiberg Museum for contemporary art
 Municipal Museum Schloss Rheydt for fine art
 Museum im Wasserturm Rheindahlen for relics of the Stone Age
 Museum Altes Zeughaus e. V. for Carnival
 Museum Schloss Wickrath for ornithology
 Bunter Garten, municipal park with botanical garden and arboretum
 Wasserturm Mönchengladbach

Twin towns – sister cities

Mönchengladbach is twinned with:

 Bradford, England, UK (1971)
 North Tyneside, England, UK (1958)
 Roubaix, France (1969)
 Roermond, Netherlands (1971)
 Thurrock, England, UK (1969)
 Verviers, Belgium (1970)

Transport
The city has two main railway stations: Mönchengladbach Hauptbahnhof and Rheydt Hauptbahnhof, the result of the merger of the two cities, in which the deprecated name for Rheydt Hbf was never removed. Line 8 of the Rhine-Ruhr S-Bahn connects the city to Düsseldorf and Hagen; an extension further westwards is being discussed. A number of regional trains serve Mönchengladbach, including regional line RE13 to the city of Venlo which is located in the Netherlands. By the end of 2009 it was the largest city in Germany without regular long-distance services. With the new schedule for 2010, Mönchengladbach got an InterCity/Intercity-Express connection twice a week.

The city also has a commercial airport called Düsseldorf Mönchengladbach.

Local bus and rail transport is carried out by the NEW-AG under the VRR transport association regulations.

Sports

Football

Mönchengladbach has a long football tradition. Its home club, Borussia Mönchengladbach, is one of the country's most well-known, best-supported, and successful teams. The club plays on the Borussia-Park stadium with a capacity of 54,057. The club has the fourth largest fan club in Germany, "The Foals" (Die Fohlen), with more than 50,000 active members.

Field hockey
The city hosted three International Field Hockey world championships: the 2006 Men's World Hockey Cup, the 2008 Women's Hockey Champions Trophy, and the 2010 Men's Hockey Champions Trophy.

Harness racing
Since 1892, Mönchengladbach has owned a harness racing track called Trabrennbahn Mönchengladbach (Trotting track Mönchengladbach).

Military

Until December 2013, the Rheindahlen Military Complex was located just outside Mönchengladbach, where it was home to the headquarters of the British Armed Forces in Germany.

Notable people

 Jacob Masen (1606–1681), Jesuit priest, historian, dramatist and theologian
 Hugo Junkers (1859–1935), engineer and entrepreneur
 Joseph Goebbels (1897–1945), Minister of Propaganda in Nazi Germany
 Lisel Haas (1898–1989), photographer 
 Hans Jonas (1903–1993), philosopher and scholar, wrote extensively on ethics
 Franz Meyers (1908–2002), politician (CDU), former minister-president North Rhine-Westphalia
 Elisabeth Gottschalk (1912–1989), German-born Dutch historical geographer and professor
 Jack Zunz (1923–2018), civil and structural engineer, former chairman of Ove Arup & Partners, principal structural designer of the Sydney Opera House
 Dietrich Nummert (1928–2021), journalist
 Petra Schürmann (1933–2010), Miss Germany 1956, Miss World 1956
 Shakuntala Banerjee (born 1973) television presenter
Hildegard Uhrmacher (born 1939), operatic soprano
 Peter Klusen (born 1951), writer, translator and cartoonist
 Reinhold Ewald (born 1956), physicist and ESA astronaut
 Walter Moers (born 1957), author
 Joscho Stephan (born 1979), gypsy jazz guitarist
 Joko Winterscheidt (born 1979), television presenter

Sport 
 Joseph Pilates (1883–1967), physical trainer, proponent of the Pilates method
 Hans Heyer (born 1943), racing driver
 Horst-Dieter Höttges (born 1943), footballer
 Günter Netzer (born 1944), footballer
 Jupp Heynckes (born 1945), footballer and manager
 Erwin Kremers (born 1949), footballer
 Ulrike von der Groeben (born 1957), television sport journalist
 Michael Frontzeck (born 1964), footballer
 Heinz-Harald Frentzen (born 1967), Formula One driver
 Jorg Albertz (born 1971), footballer
 Nick Heidfeld (born 1977), Formula One driver
 Marcell Jansen (born 1985), footballer
 Isabell Herlovsen (born 1988), Norwegian footballer
 Marc-André ter Stegen (born 1992), footballer

See also
Van Laack (1881)

References

External links

 
Cities in North Rhine-Westphalia